The Westend Shopping Center is a shopping centre built by Hungarian TriGránit Ltd.  located next to the Western Railway Station, in Budapest, Hungary. Opened on 12 November 1999, it is known for having been the largest mall in Central Europe until larger ones were inaugurated, including Arena Plaza, also in Pest.

Other notable malls in Budapest include: Allée, Arena Plaza, Árkád, Campona, Corvin Plaza, Csepel Plaza, Duna Plaza, EuroCenter, Europark, KÖKI Terminal, Lurdy Ház, Mammut, MOM Park, Pólus Center

Facts 
Client: TriGránit Development Corporation (joint venture of TrizecHahn and Granit Polus RA)
Site area: 
Total building area: 
Layout:
 retail entertainment
 offices
 Hilton International Hotel
 open space – rooftop garden/park
Special features: accessible by subway, train, bus and tram
Awards: 2001 First in Retail, Prix d’Excellence, International Real Estate Federation, Paris

Buildings and structures in Budapest
Shopping malls in Hungary
Tourist attractions in Budapest